The 2000 Delta State Statesmen football team was an American football team that represented Delta State University (DSU) as a member of the Gulf South Conference (GSC) during the 2000 NCAA Division II football season. The Statesmen advanced to the NCAA Division II playoffs and defeated  in the championship game.

Quarterback Josh Bright became the first college quarterback in Mississippi to both rush and pass for over 1,000 yards in a single season and received the Conerly Trophy as the best college football player in Mississippi.  The team's other statistical leaders included tailback Rico McDonald and wide  receiver Jason Franklin.

The team played its home games at McCool Stadium in Cleveland, Mississippi.

Schedule

References

Delta State
Delta State Statesmen football seasons
NCAA Division II Football Champions
Gulf South Conference football champion seasons
Delta State Statesmen football